An EU Battlegroup (EU BG) is a military unit adhering to the Common Security and Defence Policy (CSDP) of the European Union (EU). Often based on contributions from a coalition of member states, each of the eighteen Battlegroups consists of a battalion-sized force reinforced with combat support elements (1,500 troops). Two of the battlegroups were declared to be capable of being assembled for operational deployment at any one time. 

The Battlegroup initiative reached full operational capacity on 1 January 2007, but, they had yet to see operational service. They were developed from existing ad hoc missions that the European Union (EU) had undertaken. The troops and equipment are drawn from the Member States of the European Union under the direction of a "lead nation". In 2004, United Nations Secretary-General Kofi Annan welcomed the plans and emphasised the value and importance of the Battlegroups in helping the UN deal with troublespots.

History

Background (1999–2005) 
The initial idea to create EU multinational roughly battalion-sized combined arms units was first publicly raised at the European Council summit on 10–11 December 1999 in Helsinki. The Council produced the Headline Goal 2003 and specified the need for a rapid response capability that members should provide in small forces at high readiness. The idea was reiterated at a Franco-British summit on 4 February 2003 in Le Touquet which highlighted as a priority the need to improve rapid response capabilities, "including initial deployment of land, sea and air forces within 5–10 days." This was again described as essential in the "Headline Goal 2010".

Operation Artemis in 2003 showed an EU rapid reaction and deployment of forces in a short time scale – with the EU going from Crisis Management Concept to operation launch in just three weeks, then taking a further 20 days for substantial deployment. Its success provided a template for the future rapid response deployments allowing the idea to be considered more practically. The following Franco-British summit in November of that year stated that, building on the experience of the operation, the EU should be able and willing to deploy forces within 15 days in response to a UN request. It called specifically for "Battlegroup sized forces of around 1500 land forces, personnel, offered by a single nation or through a multinational or framework nation force package".

On 10 February 2004, France, Germany and the United Kingdom released a paper outlining the "Battlegroup concept". The document proposed a number of groups based on Artemis that would be autonomous, consisting of about 1500 personnel and deployable within 15 days. These would be principally in response to UN requests at short notice and can be rapidly tailored to specific missions. They would concentrate on bridging operations, preparing the group before a larger force relieved them, for example UN or regional peacekeepers under UN mandate. The plan was approved by all groups in 2004 and in November that year the first thirteen Battlegroups were pledged with associated niche capabilities.

Early development (2005–2015) 

From 1 January 2005 the Battlegroups reached initial operational capacity; full operational capacity was reached on 1 January 2007. Although EU member states were initially highly motivated to volunteer to fill up the roster, the fact that participating member states have to cover their own costs, which especially burdened the smaller states, has made them more reluctant. Besides, many EU member states had simultaneous obligations to fulfill for ISAF and the NATO Response Force, amongst others. This combined with the fact that EU Battlegroups have never been deployed (due to slow political decision-making), despite several occasions in which they according to various experts could or should have been (most notably DR Congo in 2006 and 2008 and Libya in 2011), has led to increasing gaps in the standby roster. Joint funding and actual usage may resolve these issues.

MPCC, EDF and PESCO (2016–2020) 
On 23 June 2016, the Brexit Referendum resulted in a vote in favour of the United Kingdom leaving the European Union. Since the UK and France were the largest military powers within the EU, this would mean a serious reduction in forces available for common European defence. On 28 June, High Representative Federica Mogherini presented a new plan, the Global EU Strategy on Security and Foreign Policy, for rigorous further European military integration between the EU member states. These included more cooperation when planning missions, training and exercising soldiers, and the development of a European defence industry. For the EU Battlegroups specifically, the plan aims to remove the obstacles preventing their rapid deployment, such as the lack of a European military headquarters. Although stressing that NATO will remain the most important defence organisation for many EU countries, Mogherini stated that the Union should be able to operate 'autonomously if necessary' on security matters. Referring to the EU's diplomacy and development record, she said that 'Soft power is not enough', and that in a less secure world, especially after Brexit, common action was needed more than ever.

On 14 November 2016, the 56 European Ministers of Foreign Affairs and Defence agreed to the Global EU Strategy on Security and Foreign Policy. This included new possibilities for the rapid deployment of EU Battlegroups with aerial support for civil and military operations in conflict zones outside Europe, for example, before a UN peacekeeping force can arrive. Although Mogherini said the Strategy was 'not a European army' or a 'NATO duplicate', the recent U.S. presidential election of Donald Trump, who had previously implicitly threatened to abandon NATO if its European member states continued to fail in meeting their funding obligations, influenced the European Ministers' decision as well. Besides Brexit and the election of Trump, Russia's military expansionism and the European migrant crisis motivated them as well, making them agree relatively easily, which analysts regarded as a breakthrough.

On 6 March 2017, the foreign and defence ministers agreed to establish a small European command centre in Brussels for military training missions abroad, which could grow out to become a European military 'headquarters' in the future. This Military Planning and Conduct Capability (MPCC) was confirmed and established by the Council of the European Union on 8 June 2017. This came one day after the European Commission launched the European Defence Fund (EDF), comprising €5.5 billion per year, to 'coordinate, supplement and amplify national investments in defence research, in the development of prototypes and in the acquisition of defence equipment and technology'. Until then, the lack of a common military fund had been the main obstacle to the effective operational deployment of the EU Battlegroups. An agreement on Permanent Structured Cooperation in Defence (PESCO) was reached at 22–23 June EU summit in Brussels. A June 2017 Eurobarometer opinion poll showed that 75% of Europeans supported a common European security and defence policy, and 55% even favoured a European army. Political leaders such as Dutch PM Mark Rutte commented that a 'European army' was not in the making, however.

Strategic Compass and the 2022 Russian invasion of Ukraine (2020–present) 
During the German EU presidency in the second half of 2020, the EU Common Security and Defence Policy began development of the Strategic Compass for Security and Defence, as of November 2021 envisioning 'substantially modified EU battlegroups' of 5,000 soldiers by 2025. While EU foreign chief Josep Borrell emphasised the EU intervention force should not be in competition with NATO, it was important to reduce operational dependency on the United States to allow EU military formations to function more autonomously, as had become more apparent during the August 2021 Kabul airlift. There continued to be problems in gathering enough troops together, and at the time only one EU Battlegroup of the standard two was available on stand-by.

The Strategic Compass was eventually adopted in March 2022. Although it had already been in development since late 2020, 24 February 2022 Russian invasion of Ukraine accelerated the development and adoption of the Strategic Compass on 21 March 2022 in Brussels at the meeting of EU foreign and defence ministers, who jointly strongly condemned Russia's actions, made a strong commitment to the complementary cooperation between the EU and NATO, and discussed plans to increase the EU's defensive capabilities. As part of the Strategic Compass, it was decided to create the EU Rapid Deployment Capacity (EU RDC) by further developing the EU Battlegroups (EUBG) 'to be able to act quickly and appropriately, in both civilian and military missions, in the event of a crisis.' As leader of the EU Battlegroup 2025 (to be operational in 2025), Germany would provide a core of the new EU RDC, supported by contributions of other EU member states. At the late May 2022 planning conference for the EU Battlegroup 2025 in Vienna involving 10 EU states, it was decided that the RDC concept was to be finalised by the end of 2022, the advanced battlegroup would include up to 5,000 soldiers from Germany and the Netherlands (lead), Austria (logistics), Hungary, Croatia, and other member states, joint exercises and training would commence in 2023, the force was to be fully operational by 2025, and would be deployed for 12 months in areas up to 6,000 kilometres measured from Brussels. Aside from ground troops, the new force was to include space and cyber capabilities, special forces and strategic airlift capacities, and, depending on requirements, air and naval forces. Another EUBG 2025 planning conference was held in September 2022 at the Multinational Joint Headquarters Ulm, which would likely also serve as the future headquarters at the military-strategic level.

Tasks 

The groups are intended to be deployed on the ground within 5–10 days of approval from the council. It must be sustainable for at least 30 days, which could be extended to 120 days, if resupplied.

The Battlegroups are designed to deal with those tasks faced by the Common Security and Defence Policy, namely the Petersberg tasks (military tasks of a humanitarian, peacekeeping and peacemaking nature).

Planners claim the Battlegroups have enough range to deal with all those tasks, although such tasks ought to be limited in "size and intensity" due to the small nature of the groups. Such missions may include conflict prevention, evacuation, aid deliverance or initial stabilisation. In general these would fall into three categories; brief support of existing troops, rapid deployment preparing the ground for larger forces or small-scale rapid response missions.

Structure
A Battlegroup is considered to be the smallest self-sufficient military unit that can be deployed and sustained in a theatre of operation. EU Battlegroups are composed of approximately 1,500 troops; plus command and support services. Since March 2022, the EU has been planning to increase their size to up to 5,000 troops per battlegroup by 2025.

There is no fixed structure, a 'standard' group would include a headquarters company, three infantry companies and corresponding support personnel. Specific units might include mechanised infantry, support groups (e.g. fire or medical support), the combination of which allows independent action by the group on a variety of tasks. The main forces, extra support and "force headquarters" (front line command) are contained within the Battlegroup "package", in addition there is the operation headquarters, located in Europe.

Battlegroups 
The initial thirteen Battlegroups were proposed on 22 November 2004. Further battlegroups have joined them since then.

Contributions 
Larger member states will generally contribute their own Battlegroups, while smaller members are expected to create common groups. Each group will have a 'lead nation' or 'framework nation' which will take operational command, based on the model set up during the EU's peacekeeping mission in the Democratic Republic of the Congo (Operation Artemis). Each group will also be associated with a headquarters. Three non-EU NATO countries, Norway, Turkey, and North Macedonia, participate in a group each, as well as one non-EU non-NATO country, Ukraine. From 1992 to 2022, Denmark had an opt-out clause in the Treaty of Maastricht and was not obliged to participate in the Common Security and Defence Policy, but following a 1 June 2022 referendum in favour of abolishing the opt-out, Denmark joined the CSDP a month later on 1 July 2022. Malta currently does not participate in any Battlegroup.

Participating EU NATO member states

 
 
 
 
 
 
 
 
 
 
 
 
 
 
 
 
 
 
 
 
 

Participating EU non-NATO member states

 
 
 
 
 

Participating non-EU NATO member states

 
 
 

Participating non-EU non-NATO member states

 
 

Non-participating EU member states

Standby roster 
From 1 January 2005 the Battlegroups reached initial operational capacity: at least one Battlegroup was on standby every 6 months. The United Kingdom and France each had an operational Battlegroup for the first half of 2005, and Italy for the second half. In the first half of 2006, a Franco-German Battlegroup operated, and the Spanish–Italian Amphibious Battlegroup. In the second half of that year just one Battlegroup operated composed of France, Germany and Belgium.

Full operational capacity was reached on 1 January 2007, meaning the Union could undertake two Battlegroup sized operations concurrently, or deploy them simultaneously into the same field. The Battlegroups rotate every 6 months, the roster from 2007 onwards is as follows;

There are plans to extend the concept to air and naval forces, although not to the extent of having a single standing force on standby, but scattered forces which could be rapidly assembled.

Recurring formations
Nordic Battlegroup
Balkan Battlegroup
Visegrád Battlegroup
Multinational Land Force
Spanish–Italian Amphibious Battlegroup

Niche capabilities
The following Member States have also offered niche capabilities in support of the EU Battlegroups:

 Cyprus (medical group)
 Lithuania (a water purification unit)
 Greece (the Athens Sealift Co-ordination Centre)
 France (structure of a multinational and deployable Force Headquarters)

Further details on specific contributions 

 Sweden and Finland announced the creation of a joint Nordic Battlegroup. To make up the required 1500 number, they also urged Norway to contribute to the Battlegroup despite that country not being part of the EU. Recently, the number has been raised to 2400 troops with Sweden providing 2000 of these. According to Swedish newspapers the price for the 6 months in 2008 was 1.2 billion Swedish kronor (app. 150,000,000 euros) and the Battlegroup was not used.
 Finland is expected to commit troops trained to combat chemical and biological weapons, among other units such as a mortar company.
 Lithuania is expected to offer experts in water purification.
 Greece is pledging troops with maritime transport skills.
 Ireland has offered bomb disposal experts among its contribution.

The Battlegroups project is not to be confused with the projected Helsinki Headline Goal force, which concerns up to 60,000 soldiers, deployable for at least a year, and take one to two months to deploy. The Battlegroups are instead meant for more rapid and shorter deployment in international crises, probably preparing the ground for a larger and more traditional force to replace them in due time.

Western Balkans Battlegroup proposal 
In 2010, a group of experts from the Belgrade Centre for Security Policy proposed the establishment of a Western Balkans Battlegroup by 2020. In a policy vision titled "Towards a Western Balkans Battlegroup: A vision of Serbia's Defence Integration into the EU 2010-2020", they argued that the creation of such a Battlegroup would not only be an accelerating factor in the accession of the former Yugoslav republics into the EU, but also a strong symbolic message of reconciliation and security community reconstruction after the devastating wars of the 1990s. Furthermore, the authors of the study argued that such a Western Balkan Battlegroup, notwithstanding all the political challenges, would have a very high linguistic, cultural and military interoperability. Although decision makers initially showed a weak interest in the Western Balkans Battlegroup, the idea has recently reappeared in the parliamentary discussions in Serbia.

Exercises 

In 2008, the EU Battlegroup conducted wargames to protect the first-ever free elections in the imaginary country of Vontinalys. In June 2014, EUBG 2014 II with 3,000 troops from Belgium, Germany, Luxembourg, North Macedonia, the Netherlands and Spain conducted a training exercise in the Ardennes, codenamed 'Quick Lion', to prevent ethnic violence between the "Greys" and the "Whites" in the imaginary country of "Blueland".

See also
 Combined Joint Expeditionary Force (CJEF)
 EUFOR
 European Union Military Staff

Notes

References

Bibliography

Further reading 
Balossi-Restelli, L.M., 2011. Fit for what? Explaining Battlegroup inaction. European security, 20 (2), 155–184. doi: 10.1080/09662839.2011.564767
Gowan, R., 2009. The case of the missing Battlegroups: Is EU-UN military cooperation in decline? Studia diplomatica, LXII (3), 53–61.
Yf Reykers, "No supply without demand: explaining the absence of the EU Battlegroups in Libya, Mali and the Central African Republic," European Security Volume 25, 2016 – Issue 3. 
Reykers, Y., 2016. Hurry up and wait: EU Battlegroups and a UN rapid reaction force [online]. Global Peace Operations Review. (http://peaceoperationsreview.org/thematic-essays/hurry-up-and-wait-eu-battlegroups-and-a-un-rapid-reaction-force/)

External links 

Factsheet (2017), European External Action Service
 Factsheet (2013), Council of the European Union
 Factsheet (2006), European Parliament
 
 A proposed evolution in the Eurocorps and ESDI in NATO